The 2012 season was the 90th season of competitive football in Ecuador.

National leagues

Serie A

Clubs in international competition

Barcelona

Copa Sudamericana

Deportivo Quito

Copa Liberatores

Copa Sudamericana

El Nacional

Copa Libertadores

Emelec

LDU Loja

National teams

Senior team

2014 FIFA World Cup qualification

References

External links
Official website  of the Ecuadorian Football Federation 
2012 league seasons on RSSSF
2016 Fútbol Ecuador, Canchas de fútbol, Apoyando al crecimiento deportivo de niños y jóvenes de Ecuador (español)

 
2012